"Settle Down" is a song by English rock band the 1975, released from their self-titled debut as the fifth single on 24 February 2014. "Settle Down" was added to the playlist of British national radio station BBC Radio 1 on 20 January 2014.

Track listing

Personnel
Adapted from liner notes.

Charts

Certifications

Release history

References

2013 songs
2014 singles
Songs written by Matthew Healy
The 1975 songs
Black-and-white music videos
Dirty Hit singles